Cyperus astartodes is a sedge of the family Cyperaceae that is native to northern parts of Australia.

The plant blooms between April and May producing yellow-brown flowers.

In Western Australia it is found on rocky slopes and outcrops in the Kimberley region where it grows in sandy-loamy soils often around sandstone. It is also found in the Northern Territory.

The species was first described in 1991 by Karen Wilson.

See also
List of Cyperus species

References

Plants described in 1991
Flora of Western Australia
astartodes
Taxa named by Karen Louise Wilson
Flora of the Northern Territory